Chapter One is a compilation album by John Sykes, released in 1998. The record features material from Sykes' solo career, as well his time with Blue Murder. The album was released by the Japanese branch of Mercury Records without Sykes' involvement.

Track listing

All songs written and composed by John Sykes, except where noted.

References

John Sykes albums
Albums produced by John Sykes
1998 compilation albums